The 1974 United States Senate election in Arizona took place on November 5, 1974. Incumbent Republican U.S. Senator Barry Goldwater decided to run for reelection to a second consecutive term, after returning to the U.S. Senate in 1968 following his failed Presidential run in 1964 against Lyndon B. Johnson. Goldwater defeated Democratic Party nominee philanthropist Jonathan Marshall in the general election.

Republican primary

Candidates
 Barry Goldwater, incumbent U.S. Senator

Democratic primary

Candidates
 Jonathan Marshall, philanthropist
 George Oglesby, attorney
 William Mathews Feighan

Results

General election

See also 
 United States Senate elections, 1974 and 1975

References

1974
Arizona
United States Senate
Barry Goldwater